High-mobility group AT-hook 2, also known as HMGA2, is a protein that, in humans, is encoded by the HMGA2 gene.

Function 
This gene encodes a protein that belongs to the non-histone chromosomal high-mobility group (HMG) protein family. HMG proteins function as architectural factors and are essential components of the enhanceosome. This protein contains structural DNA-binding domains and may act as a transcriptional regulating factor. Identification of the deletion, amplification, and rearrangement of this gene that are associated with lipomas suggests a role in adipogenesis and mesenchymal differentiation. A gene knock-out study of the mouse counterpart demonstrated that this gene is involved in diet-induced obesity. Alternate transcriptional splice variants, encoding different isoforms, have been characterized.

The expression of HMGA2 in adult tissues is commonly associated with both malignant and benign tumor formation, as well as certain characteristic cancer-promoting mutations. Homologous proteins with highly conserved sequences are found in other mammalian species, including lab mice (Mus musculus).

HMGA2 contains three basic DNA-binding domains (AT-hooks) that cause the protein to bind to adenine-thymine (AT)-rich regions of nuclear DNA. HMGA2 does not directly promote or inhibit the transcription of any genes, but alters the structure of DNA and promotes the assembly of protein complexes that do regulate the transcription of genes. With few exceptions, HMGA2 is expressed in humans only during early development, and is reduced to undetectable or nearly undetectable levels of transcription in adult tissues. The microRNA let-7 is largely responsible for this time-dependent regulation of HMGA2. The apparent function of HMGA2 in proliferation and differentiation of cells during development is supported by the observation that mice with mutant HMGA2 genes are unusually small (the pygmy or mini-mouse phenotype), and genome-wide association studies linking HMGA2-associated SNPs to variation in human height.

Regulation by let-7 
Let-7 inhibits production of specific proteins by complementary binding to their mRNA transcripts. The HMGA2 mature mRNA transcript contains seven regions complementary or nearly complementary to let-7 in its 3' untranslated region (UTR).  Let-7 expression is very low during early human development, which coincides with the greatest transcription of HMGA2. The time-dependent drop in HMGA2 expression is caused by a rise in let-7 expression.

Clinical significance

Relationship with cancer 

Heightened expression of HMGA2 is found in a variety of human cancers, but the precise mechanism by which HMGA2 contributes to the formation of cancer is unknown. The same mutations that lead to pituitary adenomas in mice can be found in similar cancers in humans. Its presence is associated with poor prognosis for the patient, but also with sensitization of the cancer cells to certain forms of cancer therapy. To be specific, HMGA2-high cancers display an abnormally strong response to double strand breaks in DNA caused by radiation therapy and some forms of chemotherapy. Artificial addition of HMGA2 to some forms of cancer unresponsive to DNA damage cause them to respond to the treatment instead, although the mechanism by which this phenomenon occurs is also not understood. However, the expression of HMGA2 is also associated with increased rates of metastasis in breast cancer, and both metastasis and recurrence of squamous cell carcinoma. These properties are responsible for patients' poor prognoses. As with HMGA2's effects on the response to radiation and chemotherapy, the mechanism by which HMGA2 exerts these effects is unknown.

A very common finding in HMGA2-high cancers is the under-expression of let-7. This is not unexpected, given let-7's natural role in the regulation of HMGA2. However, many cancers are found with normal levels of let-7 that are also HMGA2 high. Many of these cancers express the normal HMGA2 protein, but the mature mRNA transcript is truncated, missing a portion of the 3'UTR that contains the critical let-7 complementary regions. Without these, let-7 is unable to bind to HMGA2 mRNA, and, thus, is unable to repress it. The truncated mRNAs may arise from a chromosomal translocation that results in loss of a portion of the HMGA2 gene.

ERCC1 
Overexpressed HMGA2 may play a role in the frequent repression of ERCC1 in cancers.  The let-7a miRNA normally represses the HMGA2 gene, and in normal adult tissues, almost no HMGA2 protein is present.  (See also Let-7 microRNA precursor.)  Reduction or absence of let-7a miRNA allows high expression of the HMGA2 protein.  As shown by Borrmann et al., HMGA2 targets and modifies the chromatin architecture at the ERCC1 gene, reducing its expression.  These authors noted that repression of ERCC1 (by HGMA2) can reduce DNA repair, leading to increased genome instability.

ERCC1 protein expression is reduced or absent in 84% to 100% of human colorectal cancers.  ERCC1 protein expression was also reduced in a diet-related mouse model of colon cancer.  As indicated in the ERCC1 article, however, two other epigenetic mechanisms of repression of ERCC1 also may have a role in reducing expression of ERCC1 (promoter DNA methylation and microRNA repression).

Chromatin immunoprecipitation 
Genome-wide analysis of HMGA2 target genes was performed by chromatin immunoprecipitation in a gastric cell line with overexpressed HMGA2, and 1,366 genes were identified as potential targets.  The pathways they identified as associated with malignant neoplasia progression were the adherens junction pathway, MAPK signaling pathway, Wnt signaling pathway, p53 signaling pathway, VEGF signaling pathway, Notch signaling pathway, and TGF beta signaling pathway.

Non-homologous end joining DNA repair
Overexpression of HMGA2 delayed the release of DNA-PKcs (needed for non-homologous end joining DNA repair) from double strand break sites.  Overexpression of HMGA2 alone was sufficient to induce chromosomal aberrations, a hallmark of deficiency in NHEJ-mediated DNA repair.  These properties implicate HMGA2 in the promotion of genome instability and tumorigenesis. showed that

Base excision repair pathway
HMGA2 protein can cleave DNA containing apurinic/apyrimidinic (AP) sites (is an AP lyase).  In addition, this protein also possesses the related 5’-deoxyribosyl phosphate (dRP) lyase activity.  An interaction between human AP endonuclease 1 and HMGA2 in cancer cells has been demonstrated indicating that HMGA2 can be incorporated into the cellular base excision repair (BER) machinery.  Increased expression of HMGA2 increased BER, and allowed cells with increased HMGA2 to be resistant to hydroxyurea, a chemotherapeutic agent for solid tumors.

Interactions 

HMGA2 has been shown to interact with PIAS3 and NFKB1.

The transport of HMGA2 to the nucleus is mediated by an interaction between its second AT-hook and importin-α2.

See also 
HMGA

References

Further reading

External links 
 
 Ellensburg 13-year-old grapples with life at 7 feet 3 inches tall: 

Transcription factors